Federal Route 247, or Jalan Sungai Tong-Kuala Berang (formerly Terengganu State Route T11), is a federal road in Terengganu, Malaysia. It is a main route to Second East-West Highway (Federal Route 185). The Kilometre Zero is at Sungai Tong in Setiu constituency.

Features

At most sections, the Federal Route 247 was built under the JKR R5 road standard, allowing maximum speed limit of up to 90 km/h.

List of junctions and towns

References

Malaysian Federal Roads
Roads in Terengganu